Charles Gus Johnson (October 12, 1880 – October 14, 1957) was a Swedish-American politician who served as California state treasurer from 1923 to 1956.

Early life
Johnson was born on October 12, 1880, in Sweden.

Career 
From 1913 to 1921, Johnson served as California State Superintendent of Weights and Measures. Elected as California state treasurer in 1923, he was the longest-serving state treasurer. Johnson was forced to resign on October 31, 1956, after stories began to emerge over him funneling state funds into personal loans. He was a member of the California Republican Party.

Personal life
Johnson has three children: Virginia L. Johnson, Claire Fitzgerald, and George W. Johnson. Johnston died on October 14, 1957, in Sacramento, California at age 77.

References

External links
Political Graveyard

State treasurers of California
1880 births
1957 deaths
California Republicans
Swedish emigrants to the United States
20th-century American politicians